Mendim Veizaj (unknown – unknown) was an Albanian chess player, Albanian Chess Championship winner (1953).

Biography
From the begin to 1950s to the end of 1970s Mendim Veizaj was one of Albania's leading chess players. In 1953, he won Albanian Chess Championship.

Mendim Veizaj played for Albania in the Chess Olympiads:
 In 1960, at fourth board in the 14th Chess Olympiad in Leipzig (+2, =4, -7),
 In 1962, at fourth board in the 15th Chess Olympiad in Varna (+5, =2, -5).

Mendim Veizaj played for Albania in the Men's Chess Balkaniads:
 In 1979, at sixth board in the 11th Chess Balkaniad in Bihać (+1, =0, -2).

References

External links

Mendim Veizaj chess games at 365chess.com

Year of birth missing
Year of death missing
Albanian chess players
Chess Olympiad competitors
20th-century chess players